The Libertarian Party of Kentucky is the Kentucky affiliate of the Libertarian Party. The current state chair is Randall Daniel.

Background
The Libertarian Party of Kentucky, referred to as "LPKY", is the official state affiliate of the Libertarian Party (United States). The purpose of the Party is to promote libertarianism and elect candidates to office.  The Kentucky affiliate has existed since 1974, and is the third-largest political party in Kentucky.  Since the Kentucky Secretary of State's office officially began asking county clerks to track the number of Libertarian voter registrations in 2006, via 31 KAR 4:150. As of November 11, 2020, 13,619 Kentucky citizens have registered Libertarian according to the Kentucky Secretary of State voter registration statistics.

After the election of 2020, and prior to 2016, the Libertarian Party of Kentucky was considered a "political group".  An unpublished 2008 Kentucky Court of Appeals case stated that political groups are treated as Independents, as no other mechanism would exist for those groups to have their candidates placed on the ballot. Both Independents and political groups do not have automatic ballot access, meaning they must collect signatures on a petition for candidates that wish to run for office. Kentucky's ballot access rules require a different minimum number of signatures based on the office being sought, ranging between 25 and 5,000.

As a result of the 2016 General Election results for President in Kentucky, the Libertarian Party was considered, under Kentucky Revised Statutes 118.015, to be a political organization for the years 2017 through 2020. Political organizations are those whose candidate for president received at least 2%, but less than 20%, of the popular vote in the state of Kentucky in the last general election. A "political organization", the second tier in a three-tier system, grants that party ballot access, but denies them a state-operated primary. The presidential race is the only metric used for ballot access in Kentucky, and there is no mechanism for a party to petition for access in Kentucky.

State Executive Committee
LPKY Website
 Chairman  – Charles Altendorf
 Vice Chairman – Bethany Extine
 Secretary – Amanda Billings
 Treasurer – Robert Lodder

Partisan elections – Candidates
Candidates for partisan offices that wish to run as a Libertarian are nominated at a nomination convention, which can be, and historically has been, held in conjunction with the state party annual convention. A vote of registered Libertarians at convention determines who the candidate will be.  All candidates must also defeat NOTA (None of the Above) in order to obtain the ability to run as a Libertarian.  The LPKY State Party Executive Committee can vote to add additional candidates after the convention.

Past candidates

2020 partisan election results
Kentucky Board of Elections official results, 2020
 US President: Jo Jorgensen, 26,234 (1.2%) – five-way race
 US Senate: Brad Barron, 85,386 (4.0%) – three-way race
 US House, 2nd District: Robert Perry, 7,588 votes (2.1%) – four-way race
 US House, 6th District: Frank Harris, 6,491 votes (1.7%) – three-way race
 KY Senate,  3rd District: Amanda Billings, 8,157 votes (21.6%) – two-way race
 KY Senate,  5th District: Guy Miller, 3,781 votes (7.2%) – three-way race
 KY Senate, 27th District: Bryan Short, 8,989 votes (18.9%) – two-way race
 KY House,  2nd District: Joshua Gilpin, 3,118 votes (16.8%) – two-way race
 KY House, 23rd District: Tim Filback, 354 votes (1.8%) – three-way race
 KY House, 26th District: Randall Daniel, 3,813 votes (19.7%) – two-way race
 KY House, 49th District: Mitch Rushing, 639 votes (2.9%) – three-way race
 KY House, 66th District: Cristi Kendrick, 1,341 votes (5.2%) – three-way race
 KY House, 69th District: Bill Mitchell, 884 votes (4.5%) – three-way race
 KY House, 78th District: James Toller, 2,922 votes (16.9%) – two-way race

2019 partisan election results
Kentucky Board of Elections official results, 2019
 Governor / Lieutenant Governor: John Hicks / Ann Cormican, 28,433 (2.0%) – three-way race
 Auditor of Public Accounts: Kyle Hugenberg, 46,563 (3.3%) – three-way race
 Commissioner of Agriculture: Joshua Gilpin, 44,596 (3.2%) – three-way race
 Boone County Clerk (special election to fill vacancy): J. Kyle Sweeney, 1,639 (4.1%) – three-way race

2018 partisan election results
 US House, 3rd District: Gregory Boles, 3,788 (1.4%) – three-way race
 US House, 6th District: Frank Harris, 2,150 (0.7%) – five-way race
 KY House, 43rd District: John Hicks, 319 (2.3%) – three-way race
 KY House, 66th District: A J "Lex" Hannan, 328 (2.0%) – three-way race
 KY House, 72nd District: Ann Cormican, 260 (1.6%) – three-way race
 Boone County Constable #2: J Kyle Sweeney, 3,049 (20.5%)
 Boyd County Magistrate: Cory Fitzpatrick, 7 (100%) – unopposed
 Graves County Magistrate #2: Shane Walker, 1,868 (100%) – unopposed
 Greenup County Commissioner #1: Race Nichols, 274 (2.1%) – three-way race
 Mason County Magistrate #3: Trevor Applegate, 836 (100%) – unopposed
 Meade County Constable #4: Joseph Redmon, 452 (28.8%)
 Montgomery County Magistrate #2: Shannon Denniston, 1,890 (100%) – unopposed

2016 partisan election results
Kentucky Board of Elections official results, 2016
 US President: Gary Johnson, 53,749 (2.8%) – five-way race
 KY House, 6th District: David Watson, 972 (4.5%) – three-way race
 Jefferson County Commissioner, District B: Mitch Rushing (100%) – unopposed

2015 partisan election results
No candidates due to signature requirements.

2014 partisan election results
Kentucky Board of Elections official results, 2014
 US Senate: David Patterson, 44,240 votes (3.1%)
 Boone County Judge/Executive: J. Kyle Sweeney, 6,766 (22.;0%)
 Boone Co Commissioner #1: Josh Brotherton, 6,632 (22.4%)
 Boone Co Commissioner #2: Cristi Kendrick, 3,656 (11.2%) – three-way race
 Boone Co Commissioner #3: James Bozman, 5,986 (20.3%)
 Hardin Co Constable #5: Joseph Redmon, 316 (12.9%) – three-way race
 Kenton Co Clerk: Chris Robinson, 6,673 (16.3%)
 Marshall Co Magistrate #2: Tracey Roberts, (100%) – unopposed
 Montgomery Co Magistrate #3: Shannon Denniston, (100%) – unopposed
 Warren Co Constable #2: Chris Dillingham, 561 (38.6%) – listed on ballot incorrectly

2013 partisan election results
No regularly-scheduled elections in Kentucky in 2013.

2012 partisan election results
Kentucky Board of Elections official results, 2012
 President:  Gary Johnson, 17,062 votes (1.0%) – five-way race
 US House, 2nd District:  Craig Astor, 4,914 votes (1.7%) – four-way race
 Hillview City Council:  Harlen Compton, 632 votes (9th of 9)

2011 partisan election results
Kentucky Board of Elections official results, 2011
 Kentucky State Treasurer   Ken Moellman, 37,261 votes (4.6%) – three-way race

2010 partisan election results
Kentucky Board of Elections official results, 2010
 US House, 3rd District:  Ed Martin, 2,029 votes (0.8%) – four-way race
 KY House, 32nd District:  Matthew Linker, 492 votes (2.8%) – three-way race
 KY House, 43rd District:  George Conrad Dick, 1,867 votes (17.7%) – two-way race
 Boone County Magistrate, 1st District:  Eric Cranley
 Jefferson County Constable, 2nd District:  Thomas Yoder

2009 partisan election results (special)
2009 Special Election Results
 KY Senate, 18th District:  Guy E. Gibbons, Jr. (party endorsed Independent), 953 votes (5.3%) – three-way race

2008 partisan election results
Kentucky Board of Elections official results, 2008
 President: Bob Barr, 5,989 votes (0.3%)
 US House, 3rd District: Edward Martin, removed from the ballot by court order
 KY House, 81st District: J. Lance Combs, 2,754 votes (18.5%) – two-way race

2007 partisan election results
Kentucky state Executive Branch elections. No candidates due to signature requirements.

2006 partisan election results
Kentucky Board of Elections official results, 2006
 US House, 3rd District:  Donna Walker Mancini, 2,139 votes (0.9%) – four-way race
 US House, 4th District:  Brian Houillion, 10,100 votes (4.9%) – three-way race
 US House, 6th District:  Paul Ard, 27,015 votes (14.5%) – two-way race

2004 partisan election results
Kentucky Board of Elections official results, 2004
 US President: Michael Badnarik, 2,619 votes (0.1%)
 US House, 3rd District:  George Conrad Dick, 6,363 votes (1.9%)
 US House, 6th District:  Mark Gailey, 1,758 votes (0.6%)

2003 partisan election results
Kentucky state Executive Branch elections. No candidates due to signature requirements.

2002 partisan election results
Kentucky Board of Elections official results, 2002
 US House, 2nd District:  Robert Guy Dyer, 2,084 votes (1.2%)
 US House, 4th District:  John Grote, 2,308 votes (1.3%)
 US House, 6th District:  Mark Gailey, 3,313 votes (2.1%)

2000 partisan election results
Kentucky Board of Elections official results, 2000
 US President: Harry Browne, 2,896 votes (0.2%)
 US House, 2nd District:  Michael A. Kirkman, 2,125 votes (0.9%)
 US House, 3rd District:  Donna Walker Mancini, 7,804 votes (2.9%)
 US House, 4th District:  Alan Handleman, 1,486 votes (0.6%)
 US House, 6th District:  Joseph Novak, 1,229 votes (0.5%)
 KY Senate, 19th District:  Nick Karem, 1,029 votes (2.3%)
 KY House, 36th District:  Mark Gailey, 832 votes (7.6%)

1996 partisan election results
Kentucky Board of Elections official results, 1996
 US President: Harry Browne, 4,009 votes (0.5%) – six-way race
 US Senate:  Dennis L. Lacy, 8,595 votes (0.7%) – five-way race

1992 partisan election results
Kentucky Board of Elections official results, 1992
 US President: Andre Marrou, 4,513 votes (0.3%) – seven-way race
 US Senate:  James A. Ridenour, 17,366 votes (1.3%) – three-way race

1988 partisan election results
Kentucky Board of Elections official results, 1988
 US President: Ron Paul, 2,118 votes (0.2%) – five-way race

1984 partisan election results
No Libertarian Presidential Candidate in 1984 on Kentucky ballot.

1982 partisan election results
Kentucky Board of Elections official results, 1982
 US House, 3rd District:  Dan Murray, 608 votes (0.4%)
 US House, 4th District:  Paul Thiel, 706 votes (0.5%)
 US House, 6th District:  Ken Ashby, 1,185 votes (1.0%)

1980 partisan election results

 US President: Ed Clark, 5,531 votes (0.4%) – five-way race

References

External links
 Libertarian Party of Kentucky

Kentucky
Political parties in Kentucky